Rococo were an Italian dance duo, best known for their 1989 single "Italo House Mix" which featured interpretations of Italo house songs at the time.

Discography

Albums

Singles

References

Italian dance music groups